The 1969–70 Scottish Second Division was won by Falkirk who, along with second placed Cowdenbeath, were promoted to the First Division. Hamilton Academical finished bottom.

Table

References 

 Scottish Football Archive

Scottish Division Two seasons
2
Scot